Sergey Petrovich Alay (born 11 June 1965) is a retired Belarusian hammer thrower, whose personal best throw is 82.00 metres, achieved in May 1992 in Stayki.

Achievements

External links

1965 births
Living people
Belarusian male hammer throwers
Athletes (track and field) at the 1996 Summer Olympics
Olympic athletes of Belarus